Saint Tryphon of Pechenga (1495–1583) was a Russian monk and ascetic in the Eastern Orthodox Church on the Kola Peninsula and in Lapland in the 16th century. He is considered to be the founder of the Pechenga Monastery and "Enlightener of the Sami".

Life and missionary work 
Baptized with the name Mitrofan, he was the son of a priest from the Novgorod region. Trained as a military engineer, he felt that he was called by God to proclaim the Gospels to the Sámi. Though he was met with hostility from the pagans, he was effective in convincing many of them to convert to Christianity. His effectiveness is attributed to the fact that he took the time to study their beliefs and languages.

With permission from Archbishop Macarius of Novgorod to found a Church of the Annunciation up north, Mitrofan was tonsured a monk with the religious name Tryphon and ordained a hieromonk. After his ordination and tonsure, Tryphon became the leader of the Holy Trinity Monastery on the banks of the Pechenga River. He continued spreading the Gospel to the residents near the river.

Veneration 
Saint Tryphon died in 1583 at the age of 88 and is commemorated on December 15 in the Eastern Orthodox Church. Russian seamen traditionally pray to Tryphon when they are in danger.

Saint Tryphon is relatively unknown in the greater Orthodox traditions, but achieved and maintained popularity among Orthodox Christians in the Lapland Regions. His popularity is often attributed to his skillful blends of Orthodoxy and pagan practices.

See also 
 Skolts

References

External links
 Venerable Tryphon the Abbot of Pechenga (Kolsk) Orthodox icon and synaxarion

1583 deaths
Russian saints
16th-century Christian saints
Year of birth unknown
Eastern Orthodox saints
1495 births